Louis D. Lighton (November 25, 1895 – February 1, 1963) was an American screenwriter and producer. He wrote for 40 films between 1920 and 1927. He also produced 30 films between 1928 and 1951. He was born in Omaha, Nebraska and died in Palma de Mallorca, Spain. He was married to fellow screenwriter Hope Loring.

Selected filmography

 The Champion Liar (1920)
 The Big Catch (1920)
 Flesh and Blood (1922)
 Paid Back (1922)
 The Woman of Bronze (1923)
 An Old Sweetheart of Mine (1923)
 Don't Marry for Money (1923)
 East Side - West Side (1923)
 Cornered (1924)
 K – The Unknown (1924)
 The Lullaby (1924)
 Little Annie Rooney (1925)
 Wandering Footsteps (1925)
 Ranger of the Big Pines (1925)
 The Crown of Lies (1926)
 The Blind Goddess (1926)
 Fig Leaves (1926)
 It (1927)
 Children of Divorce (1927)
 Wings (1927)
 The Virginian (1929)
 Tom Sawyer (1930)
 Alice in Wonderland (1933, uncredited)
 The Lives of a Bengal Lancer (1935)
 Captains Courageous (1937)
 Test Pilot (1938)
 A Tree Grows in Brooklyn (1945)
 The Black Rose (1950)
 No Highway in the Sky (1951)

External links

1895 births
1963 deaths
American male screenwriters
American film producers
20th-century American male writers
20th-century American screenwriters